Church of the Nativity of the Blessed Virgin Mary in Głubczyce, Poland, is a Gothic brick church, part of the Roman Catholic Diocese of Opole. 

The church was built in 1240 and further expanded in the fourteenth-century, as well as in between 1903-1907 by architect Max Hasak. The present interior of the church originates from the 1903-1907 building work. The church contains a plethora of architectural distinctiveness, i.e. the southern frontal Baroque-topped tower, three early-Gothic stone portals from the thirteenth-century and a transept crosswide nave.

References

Głubczyce County
Głubczyce